The 2018 Women's Pan-American Volleyball Cup was the 17th edition of the annual women's volleyball tournament. It was held in Santo Domingo, Dominican Republic from 8 to 14 July. Twelve teams competed and the top five ranked teams at the end of the tournament qualified to the 2019 Pan American Games in Lima, Peru.

The United States won the second straight title (sixth in history) after defeating the Dominican Republic 3–2 in the final. American Lauren Carlini was awarded the Most Valuable Player.

Pools composition

Venue
Ricardo Arias Gymnasium, Santo Domingo

Pool standing procedure
 Number of matches won
 Match points
 Points ratio
 Sets ratio
 Result of the last match between the tied teams

Match won 3–0: 5 match points for the winner, 0 match points for the loser
Match won 3–1: 4 match points for the winner, 1 match point for the loser
Match won 3–2: 3 match points for the winner, 2 match points for the loser

Preliminary round
All times are Atlantic Standard Time (UTC−04:00)

Group A

Group B

Group C

Final round

Championship bracket

5th–8th places bracket

9th–12th places bracket

Classification 7th–10th

Quarterfinals

Classification 9th–12th

Classification 5th–8th

11th place match

9th place match

Semifinals

7th place match

5th place match

3rd place match

Final

Final standing

Individual awards

Most Valuable Player
  Lauren Carlini
Best Setter
  Lauren Carlini
Best Outside Hitters
  Brayelin Martínez
  Elina Rodríguez
Best Middle Blockers
  Chiaka Ogbogu
  Melissa Rangel
Best Opposite
  Krystle Esdelle
Best Scorer
  Krystle Esdelle
Best Server
  Kiera Van Ryk
Best Libero
  Brenda Castillo
Best Digger
  Brenda Castillo
Best Receiver
  Brenda Castillo

References

Women's Pan-American Volleyball Cup
Pan-American Volleyball Cup
International volleyball competitions hosted by the Dominican Republic
2018 in Dominican Republic women's sport
Sport in Santo Domingo
Qualification tournaments for the 2019 Pan American Games